The 1929 South American Championships in Athletics  were held in Lima, Peru between 5 and 10 May.

Medal summary

Men's events

Medal table

External links
 Men Results – GBR Athletics
 Women Results – GBR Athletics

S
South American Championships in Athletics
A
Sports competitions in Lima
1929 in South American sport
1929 in Peruvian sport